Vernon Glass (October 14, 1928 – December 3, 2005) was an American football coach. He served as head football coach at Lamar University from 1963 to 1975, compiling a record of 63–68–1.

Glass was a standout quarterback in Corpus Christi, Texas, and played in the 1947 Oil Bowl alongside Hayden Fry. He chose to attend Rice University, where he was a three-year letter-winner in both football and baseball. He captained the 1950 football team and the 1951 baseball team. He keyed Rice's drive to the 1949 Southwest Conference crown, including a 17–15 win over Texas in a showdown in Austin, Texas. Rice also won the 1950 Cotton Bowl Classic against the University of North Carolina, which was led by Charlie Justice, also known as "Choo Choo".

Before joining the coaching profession, Glass spent two years in the United States Air Force, leading Carswell Air Force Base to the 1952 national service championship. He also played one year of professional baseball at Corpus Christi in 1953. Glass started his coaching career at Del Mar College, a junior college in Corpus Christi. After three seasons as assistant, he spent one year as head coach, guiding the Vikings to a 9–0 record before falling in the Junior Rose Bowl. Glass then left Del Mar to serve as an assistant coach under John Bridgers at Baylor University from 1960 to 1962.

Lamar
In 1963, he became head coach at Lamar State College of Technology—now known as Lamar University—in Beaumont, Texas, guiding the Cardinals to 6–3–1 record and the Southland Conference (SLC) title in just his second year. Lamar was invited to the Pecan Bowl, where they lost 19–17 to the State College of Iowa. Glass also helped Lamar win SLC titles in 1965 and 1966, which gave the Cardinals three straight conference championships. The other SLC title came in 1971. His best season at Lamar was in 1974 when the Cardinals posted an 8–2 record. He was named SLC Coach of the Year in 1970 and 1974. In addition, Glass was named NCAA College Division Coach of the Year in 1964 and 1965 and was recognized by the Texas Sports Writers Association at Junior College Coach of the Year in 1959.

In September 2009, Bart Simmons, a Lamar University alumnus, donated $200,000 to create a football practice facility, the "Coach Vernon Glass Field of Champions".

Head coaching record

College

References

External links
 

1928 births
2005 deaths
American football quarterbacks
Baylor Bears football coaches
Lamar Cardinals football coaches
Rice Owls football players
Junior college football coaches in the United States
People from Cass County, Texas
Sportspeople from Corpus Christi, Texas
Players of American football from Texas